Bad Hombres is a 2020 American documentary film about the Tecolotes de los Dos Laredos, a professional binational baseball team that played half of its home games in Texas during the 2019 baseball season.

Synopsis
The documentary focuses on Tecolotes de los Dos Laredos, a Minor League Baseball team (the world's only binational pro baseball team), as well as on their families. Shot during the team's 2019 season, the documentary follows them during 120 games and explores Mexico–United States relations.

Release 
Bad Hombres was released on Showtime on October 16, 2020.

Reception 
In a review for the Houston Chronicle, Matt Young wrote that Bad Hombres had touching moments.

References

External links
 

2020 television films
2020 films
2020 documentary films
2020s American films
2020s English-language films
2020s Spanish-language films
2020s sports films
American baseball films
American sports documentary films
Documentary films about baseball
Showtime (TV network) documentary films
Sports television films